Roberto Tapia is an American singer of Mexican ancestry. He was born in San Diego, California and raised in Culiacán, Sinaloa, Mexico. He adopted the Regional Mexican genre and in August 2012, his album El Muchacho hit #1 on Billboards Top Latin Albums chart.  Tapia was one of three coaches on the first two seasons of La Voz Kids (The Voice Kids), a Spanish-language version of The Voice featuring American Spanish-speaking children on the Telemundo Network. He inclusively became a business man in the year of 2013, promoting restaurants, and still continuing with his singer life.

Early life 
Hailing from Lake Forest, California, Tapia's parents migrated to the United States before his birth. Tapia was born in San Diego. His family then decided to relocate to Mexico. Tapia spent much of his youth in Culiacán, Sinaloa, where, at age 9, he entered the Difocur School of music in Culiacan, now known as the Instituto Sinaloense de Cultura (ISIC). Tapia specialized in clarinet, but also learned guitar and percussion instruments. During this time, Tapia gained public playing experience by performing with acts such as the Symphony of Sinaloa.

At 13, the Tapia family again migrated to the US. Initially reluctant, Tapia was convinced by family and friends to perform at local venues such as dance halls and receptions. Before signing with a professional label, Tapia went door to door at record shops attempting to sell his recordings. At 17, Tapia's professional debut performance came in Tijuana, Baja California alongside fellow Sinaloan artist, El Lobito de Sinaloa. Tapia signed with Sony International and began his first album, blending his regional Norteña music with hints of electronica and hip hop.

Career 

Roberto Tapia performances include the Nokia Theater in Los Angeles, California and the Oregon Convention Center in Portland.

He appeared on Latin Billboard Awards, LATV, and Universal Music Latino.

In 2011, Tapia appeared at the Plaza Mexico in Lynwood, CA to celebrate Mexico's Independence.

In honor of his hometown, Roberto performed at El Palanque Culiacán to celebrate the Feria Ganadera de Culiacán (Culiacán Cattle Fair), an annual traditional festival celebrating the Mexican Revolution, where everyone shares music, culture and food.

Discography

2002- Roberto Tapia (Self-Titled) [Sony International] 
Released: March 18, 2002

Tracks 
 Entrega de Amor (2:29)  Love's Delivery
 Loco, Loco (3:10) Crazy, Crazy
 Celos (2:51) Jealousy
 Por Una Mentira (3:14) For a Lie
 Inolvidable (3:13) Unforgettable
 Te Amo, Te Amo (3:35) I Love You, I Love You
 Que el Mundo Ruede (2:49) May The World Revolve
 Incompleto (3:48) Incomplete
 Cuando un Amor (2:47) When a Love
 Que Locura (3:47) What Crazyness
 Te Traigo Ganas (2:44) I’ve Been Wanting You
 Amores Como el Nuestro (2:51) Love Like Ours

2008- Los Amigos del M (Machete Music) 
Released: January 29, 2008

Tracks 
 Pensé Que Te Había Olvidado (2:59) Thought I Had Forgotten You
 Los Amigos del M (3:39) The Friends of M
 Las Edades (2:51) Ages
 Mi Gran Tesoro (3:17) My Grand Treasure
 El Corrido de Chalo Araujo (3:43) The Ballad of Chalo Araujo
 Le Semana Completita (3:04) The Week Completely
 Corrido del Frankie (2:28) Frankies’ Ballad
 Por Verte Felíz (3:25) To SeeYou Happy
 El Hijo del Mayo (2:36) The Son of Mayo
 Pa' Que Quieres Que Vuelva (2:28) Why Do You Want Me To Return
 El Corrido del Ranchero (3:20) The Ballad of the Rancher
 El Amanecido (3:05) The Waker
 El Corrido del Bitache (2:58) The Ballad of Bitache

2009- El Nino De la Tuna (Fonovisa) 
Released: May 26, 2009 The ballad "El Nino de la Tuna" described Chapo Guzman’s life story and was his first hit single.

Tracks 
 Mi Gran Amor (2:58) My Great Love
 El Niño de la Tuna (3:39)
 Como Me Engañaste (3:46) How Did You Deceive Me
 Pancho Loco (3:25) Crazy Pancho
 Desilusión (2:46) Delusion
 El Maserati (2:30) The Maserati
 Caminos Differentes (2:56) Different Paths
 Gente de Guzmán (3:30) Guzman's People
 La Tambora (2:29) The Drum
 Iván el Chapito (3:32) Ivan the Shortie
 Cuando Me Dices Mi Amor (2:40) When You Tell Me Love
 El Animal (2:39) The Animal
 Skit (1:20)
 El Gallo de Sinaloa (3:02) The Rooster from Sinaloa

2010- La Batalla (Fonovisa)
Released: September 7, 2010

Tracks
 Brazo Armado (3:02) Armed Arm
 No Fue Fácil (3:27) It Wasn't Easy
 El Cachorro del Animal (3:45) The Animal's Offspring
 No Pensaba Enamorarme (3:19) I Didn't Think Of Falling In Love
 La Batalla (3:33) The Battle
 Me Duele (3:22) It Hurts
 Bandera del Chapo (3:49) Chapo's Flag
 Qué Te Faltó (3:12) What Else Did You Need
 El Jefe de la Familia (3:04) The Boss of the Family
 Tal Vez (3:06) Perhaps
 Las Calaveras del Chino (2:25) The Chinamans Skeletons
 Tú También Fallaste (3:05) You Too Failed
 Comandos del Yupo (3:42) Yupo's Commandments
 La Charla (3:36) The Charla

2011-El Corrido del niño (La Disco Music /Twins Enterprise)
Released: October 11, 2011. While this album included narcocorridos, the related death of his cousin reduced his use of such lyrics.

Tracks 
 Amor Limosnero (2:17) Love Beggers
 El Corrido del niño (2:22) The Ballad of the Boy
 Estúpido Por Ti (3:09) Stupid For You
 Flor Hermosa (2:36) Beautiful Flower
 Me Dan Miedo Las Noches (2:28) The Nights Scare Me
 Me Importa Poco La Muerte (2:05) I careless about Death
 Me Las Vas A Dar (2:31) You Will Give Them To Me
 Pechos Calientes (2:44) Hot Breasts
 Sin Hablar (2:31)  Without Speaking
 Te Quiero Como La Boca (2:42) I Love You Like the Mouth
 Una Noche No (2:23) One Night, No
 Ya Sabías Que Era Casado (2:38) You Already Knew I Was Married

2011- Live (Fonovisa) 
Recorded during his sold-out concert at the Los Angeles Nokia Theatre. This album was awarded the Regional Mexican Album and Top Latin Albums in 2011.

Tracks 
 Me Duele (3:56) "It Hurts"
 Por Verte Feliz (3:15) "To See You Happy"
 Amigos Del M (3:34) "M's Friends"
 Ivan El Chapito (3:29) "Ivan The Shorty"
 Edades (6:07) "Ages"
 Como me Engañaste (4:29) "How did You Deceive Me"
 Pancho Loco (3:49) "Crazy Pancho"
 Mazerati (2:35) "The Maserati"
 Niño De La Tuna (3:43) "Child of the Prickly Pear"
 Animal (2:32) "Animal"
 Hijo Del Mayo (2:50)
 Caminos Differentes (5:12) "Different Paths"
 Comandos Del Yupo (3:45) "Yupo's Commandments"

2012- El Muchacho (Fonovisa)
Released Date: July 24, 2012 El Muchacho reached first place in the “Hot Latin Albums” and “Regional Mexican Sales” Billboard charts. El Muchacho earned titles including Top Latin Albums, Regional Mexican Albums, The Billboard 200 and Top Latin Albums. Los Premios de la Radio (The Radio Awards) nominated Roberto Tapia as Artist of the year, male artist of the year and the best song with banda ‘Mirando al Cielo’ in 2012.

Tracks 
 El Muchacho (4:25) The Guy
 Crei (3:14) I Thought
 La Carta Fuerte (3:19) The Strong Letter
 Le Pregunte Al Corazon (3:24) I Asked the Heart
 El Mini Lic (3:04) The Mini Lic
 Mirando Al Cielo (3:59) Looking at the Sky
 La posada (3:41) The Shelter
 Amor Perdido (3:29) Lost Love
 El Michoacano (2:55) The Michoacano
 Que Raro Se Siente Todo (3:01) How Weird It All Feels
 Ahora Que Te Conoci (3:02) Now That I’ve Met You
 Ya Me Siento Como Nuevo (3:22) I Already Feel Like New
 El Muchacho(4:26) The Guy
 El Minic Lic (3:04) The Mic Lic

References

External links
"Telemundo Shows." La Voz Kids El Nuevo Show De Talento De Niños Por Telemundo . | Telemundo. Telemundo, 2013.
"Roberto Tapia." Billboard. N.p., 2013.
"Roberto Tapia." Univision Musica. N.p., 2013. Web. 2013.
Buena, Musica.com. "Roberto Tapia - Música, Videos, Canciones, Letras, Biografía Y Discografía." Roberto Tapia. N.p.,
" El Niño De La Tuna by Roberto Tapia on AllMusic" AllMusic. Rovi Corp. AllMusic.com, Apr. 2013.
"Telemundo Shows""EL Señor De Los Cielos"

Living people
American male singers
Mexican male singers
Musicians from San Diego
People from Culiacán
Singers from Sinaloa
Singers from California
Universal Music Latin Entertainment artists
Latin music songwriters
1981 births